Cemre Gümeli (born 1993) is a Turkish stage and film actress.

Biography 
Cemre Gümeli was born in 1993 in Istanbul, Turkey. As a child, she trained ballet. She studied media, communication and culture management at Istanbul Bilgi University.

She was an exchange student in New York City where she studied acting and art history, and trained within the Meisner system.

Career 
Gümeli has worked as a Shakespearian actor, playing the role of Puck in a 2015 production of A Midsummer Night's Dream directed by Caghan Suzgun at the Istasyon theatre, and Lady Anne in Richard III directed by Yiğit Sertdemir, at Kumbaracı 50 Theater.

In 2011 she appeared in the film Game of Hera directed by Kıvanç Sezer. In 2016 she got the role of Simay in the TV series Tatlı İntikam, and in 2018 she played the role of Hande Fettah in the miniseries Servet. In 2018 and 2019 she played the role of Cansu Kara in the series Elimi birakma. In 2019 and 2020 she appeared in the web series Puma.
In 2020, she joined the cast of the series Bay Yanlış, where she played the role of lawyer Deniz Koparan. In 2021 and 2022 she played the role of Meryem in the series Barbaros: Sword of the Mediterranean (Barbaroslar: Akdeniz'in Kilici).

Filmography

Cinema

TV series

Web TV

Theater

References

External links 

 
 

Living people
1993 births
Turkish television actresses
Turkish film actresses
Actresses from Istanbul
Turkish female models
Turkish twins
Twin models
Turkish dancers